This is a list of notable Bulgarian architects:

A–M

 Victoria Angelova (1902–1947)
 Alexander Georgiev Barov
 Stancho Belkovski
 Milka Bliznakov
 Andrey Damyanov
 Nikolay Diulgheroff
 Kolyu Ficheto
 Georgi Fingov
 Konstantin Jovanović
 Nikola Lazarov
 Yordan Milanov
 Petko Momchilov

N–Z

 Kamen Petkov
 Josef Schnitter
 Naum Torbov
 Milenko Velev
 Ivan Vasilyov

See also

 List of architects
 List of Bulgarians

Bulgarian
Architects